Elvin Sərkər oğlu Camalov (born 4 February 1995) is an Azerbaijani footballer who plays as a midfielder for Sabah and the Azerbaijan national team.

Career
Camalov made his international debut for Azerbaijan on 19 November 2019 in a UEFA Euro 2020 qualifying match against Slovakia.

Career statistics

Club

International

References

External links

1995 births
Living people
Azerbaijani footballers
Azerbaijan international footballers
Association football midfielders
Gabala FC players
Zira FK players
Azerbaijan Premier League players
Place of birth missing (living people)